Codex Petropolitanus (Russian, "Петербургский кодекс" Peterburgskiy Kodeks), designated by Π or 041 (in the Gregory-Aland numbering), ε 73 (von Soden), is a Greek uncial manuscript of the Gospels, dated palaeographically to the 9th-century. The manuscript is lacunose.

Description 

The codex contains an almost complete text of the four Gospels on 350 parchment leaves (14.5 cm by 10.5 cm) with some lacunae in Matt 3:12-4:17; 19:12-20:2; Luke 1:76-2:18; John 6:15-35; 8:6-39; 9:21-10:3. Texts of Mark 16:18-20 and John 21:22-25 were supplied by minuscule hand in the 12th-century.

The text is written in one column per page, 21 lines per page. The letters are small, with breathings, and accents.

The tables of the  before each Gospel. The text is divided according to the Ammonian Sections with a references to the Eusebian Canons.

The texts of John 5:4 and 8:3-6 are marked by an asterisk (manuscript is lacunae from v6 from κύψας to after τέκνα in 8:39).

Text 
The Greek text of this codex is a representative of the Byzantine text-type, in close relationship to the Codex Alexandrinus, and other later uncials. Together with Codex Cyprius it belongs to the textual family Π. Aland placed it in Category V.

Luke 9:55-56
 στραφεις δε επετιμησεν αυτοις και ειπεν, Ουκ οιδατε ποιου πνευματος εστε υμεις; ο γαρ υιος του ανθρωπου ουκ ηλθεν ψυχας ανθρωπων απολεσαι αλλα σωσαι (but He turned and rebuked them and He said: "You do not know what manner of spirit you are of; for the Son of man came not to destroy men's lives but to save them) — as in codices Codex Cyprius 1079 1242 1546 (f1 omit γαρ) (Θ f13 omit υμεις and γαρ).

History 
 Found
The manuscript belonged to the family Parodi in Smyrna. It was brought by Tischendorf in 1859.

 Present location 
The codex is located in the National Library of Russia (Gr. 34) in Saint Petersburg.

See also 

 List of New Testament uncials
 Codex Petropolitanus (disambiguation)
 Textual criticism

References

Further reading 

 C. v. Tischendorf, Notitia editionis codicis Bibliorum Sinaitici, 1860, pp. 51 f. 
 Silva Lake, Family Π and the Codex Alexandrinus: The Text According to Mark, S & D V (London 1937). 
 J. Greelings, Family Π in Luke, S & D XXII (Salt Lake City, 1962). 
 R. Champlin, Family Π in Matthew, S & D XXIV (Salt Lake City, 1964).

External links 
 
 Codex Petropolitanus Π (041): at the Encyclopedia of Textual Criticism.
 Codex Petropolitanus Π (041): at the Russian National Library.

Greek New Testament uncials
9th-century biblical manuscripts
Codex Petropolitanus (New Testament)